New Hope is a census-designated place (CDP) in Augusta County, Virginia, United States. The population as of the 2010 Census was 797.

New Hope High School was listed on the National Register of Historic Places in 1985.

References

Virginia Trend Report 2: State and Complete Places (Sub-state 2010 Census Data)
GNIS reference

Unincorporated communities in Virginia
Census-designated places in Augusta County, Virginia
Census-designated places in Virginia